These 366 species belong to the genus Dolichogenidea, braconid wasps.

Dolichogenidea species

 Dolichogenidea aberrantenna Liu & Chen, 2018
 Dolichogenidea absona (Muesebeck, 1965)
 Dolichogenidea acratos (Nixon, 1967)
 Dolichogenidea acrobasidis (Muesebeck, 1921)
 Dolichogenidea acron (Nixon, 1967)
 Dolichogenidea aegeriphagous Liu & Chen, 2018
 Dolichogenidea agamedes (Nixon, 1965)
 Dolichogenidea agilis (Ashmead, 1905)
 Dolichogenidea agilla (Nixon, 1972)
 Dolichogenidea agonoxenae (Fullaway, 1941)
 Dolichogenidea alaria (Kotenko, 1986)
 Dolichogenidea albipennis (Nees, 1834)
 Dolichogenidea alejandromasisi Fernandez-Triana & Boudreault, 2019
 Dolichogenidea alophogaster Liu & Chen, 2019
 Dolichogenidea altithoracica Liu & Chen, 2019
 Dolichogenidea aluella (Nixon, 1967)
 Dolichogenidea alutacea (Balevski, 1980)
 Dolichogenidea amaris (Nixon, 1967)
 Dolichogenidea anarsiae (Faure & Alabouvette, 1924)
 Dolichogenidea ancylotergita Liu & Chen, 2018
 Dolichogenidea angelagonzalezae Fernandez-Triana & Boudreault, 2019
 Dolichogenidea angularis Song, Chen & Yang, 2006
 Dolichogenidea annularis (Haliday, 1834)
 Dolichogenidea anterocava Liu & Chen, 2019
 Dolichogenidea anteruga Liu & Chen, 2018
 Dolichogenidea apicurvus Liu & Chen, 2019
 Dolichogenidea appellator (Telenga, 1949)
 Dolichogenidea argiope (Nixon, 1965)
 Dolichogenidea artissima (Papp, 1971)
 Dolichogenidea artusicarina Song & Chen, 2004
 Dolichogenidea ashoka Rousse, 2013
 Dolichogenidea atarsi Liu & Chen, 2019
 Dolichogenidea ate (Nixon, 1973)
 Dolichogenidea atreus (Nixon, 1973)
 Dolichogenidea azovica (Kotenko, 1986)
 Dolichogenidea bakeri (Wilkinson, 1932)
 Dolichogenidea bambusae (Wilkinson, 1928)
 Dolichogenidea banksi (Viereck, 1911)
 Dolichogenidea baoris (Wilkinson, 1930)
 Dolichogenidea basiflava (Papp, 1974)
 Dolichogenidea benevolens (Papp, 1973)
 Dolichogenidea benkevitshi (Kotenko, 1986)
 Dolichogenidea bersa (Papp, 1976)
 Dolichogenidea betheli (Viereck, 1911)
 Dolichogenidea bicolor Song & Chen, 2004
 Dolichogenidea biconcava Liu & Chen, 2018
 Dolichogenidea bilecikensis Inanç & Cetin Erdogan, 2004
 Dolichogenidea bimacula Song & Chen, 2004
 Dolichogenidea biplagae (Fischer, 1968)
 Dolichogenidea biroi (Szépligeti, 1905)
 Dolichogenidea bisulcata (Cameron, 1909)
 Dolichogenidea bonbonensis Fagan-Jeffries & Austin, 2019
 Dolichogenidea borysthenica (Kotenko, 1986)
 Dolichogenidea brabyi Fagan-Jeffries & Austin, 2019
 Dolichogenidea bres (Nixon, 1973)
 Dolichogenidea breviattenuata Liu & Chen, 2019
 Dolichogenidea brevicarinata Chen & Song, 2004
 Dolichogenidea brevifacialis Liu & Chen, 2018
 Dolichogenidea breviventris (Ratzeburg, 1848)
 Dolichogenidea britannica (Wilkinson, 1941)
 Dolichogenidea broadi Rousse, 2013
 Dolichogenidea bushnelli (Muesebeck, 1933)
 Dolichogenidea cacoeciae (Riley, 1881)
 Dolichogenidea californica (Muesebeck, 1921)
 Dolichogenidea cameroonensis Walker, 1994
 Dolichogenidea candidata (Haliday, 1834)
 Dolichogenidea caniae (Wilkinson, 1928)
 Dolichogenidea carborugosa Liu & Chen, 2019
 Dolichogenidea carlosmanuelrodriguezi Fernandez-Triana & Boudreault, 2019
 Dolichogenidea carposinae (Wilkinson, 1938)
 Dolichogenidea catonix (Shenefelt, 1972)
 Dolichogenidea cauda Song & Chen, 2004
 Dolichogenidea celsa (Papp, 1975)
 Dolichogenidea cerialis (Nixon, 1976)
 Dolichogenidea changbaiensis Liu & Chen, 2018
 Dolichogenidea cheles (Nixon, 1972)
 Dolichogenidea chrysis (Nixon, 1973)
 Dolichogenidea cinerosa (Papp, 1971)
 Dolichogenidea cinnarae Gupta, Lokhande & Soman, 2013
 Dolichogenidea claniae (You & Zhou, 1990)
 Dolichogenidea clausa Liu & Chen, 2019
 Dolichogenidea clavata (Provancher, 1881)
 Dolichogenidea coequata (Nixon, 1967)
 Dolichogenidea coffea (Wilkinson, 1930)
 Dolichogenidea colchica (Tobias, 1976)
 Dolichogenidea coleophorae (Wilkinson, 1938)
 Dolichogenidea concentrica Liu & Chen, 2018
 Dolichogenidea coniferae (Haliday, 1834)
 Dolichogenidea coniferoides  (Papp, 1972)
 Dolichogenidea conpuncta Liu & Chen, 2019
 Dolichogenidea contergita Song & Chen, 2004
 Dolichogenidea cordiae Ahmad, 2019 & Pandey
 Dolichogenidea coretas (Nixon, 1965)
 Dolichogenidea corvina (Reinhard, 1880)
 Dolichogenidea crassa Liu & Chen, 2019
 Dolichogenidea credne (Nixon, 1973)
 Dolichogenidea cucurbita Liu & Chen, 2019
 Dolichogenidea cultriformis Song & Chen, 2004
 Dolichogenidea cyamon (Nixon, 1967)
 Dolichogenidea cyane (Nixon, 1965)
 Dolichogenidea cytherea (Nixon, 1972)
 Dolichogenidea decora (Haliday, 1834)
 Dolichogenidea diaphantus (Nixon, 1965)
 Dolichogenidea dilecta (Haliday, 1834)
 Dolichogenidea dioryctriphagous Liu & Chen, 2018
 Dolichogenidea diparopsidis (Lyle, 1927)
 Dolichogenidea discreta (Szépligeti, 1914)
 Dolichogenidea dolichocephalus (Muesebeck, 1921)
 Dolichogenidea drusilla (Nixon, 1972)
 Dolichogenidea dryas (Nixon, 1965)
 Dolichogenidea earterus (Wilkinson, 1930)
 Dolichogenidea eleagnellae (Tobias, 1976)
 Dolichogenidea emarginata (Nees, 1834)
 Dolichogenidea ensiformis (Ratzeburg, 1844)
 Dolichogenidea ensiger (Say, 1836)
 Dolichogenidea erasmi (Nixon, 1972)
 Dolichogenidea erdoesi (Papp, 1973)
 Dolichogenidea erevanica (Tobias, 1976)
 Dolichogenidea eros (Wilkinson, 1932)
 Dolichogenidea eucalypti Austin & Allen, 1989
 Dolichogenidea evadne (Nixon, 1955)
 Dolichogenidea evonymellae (Bouché, 1834)
 Dolichogenidea excellentis Liu & Chen, 2019
 Dolichogenidea exilis (Haliday, 1834)
 Dolichogenidea fakhrulhajiae (Mahdihassan, 1925)
 Dolichogenidea falcator (Ratzeburg, 1852)
 Dolichogenidea faucula (Nixon, 1972)
 Dolichogenidea fernandeztrianai Abdoli & Talebi, 2019
 Dolichogenidea ficicola Donaldson, 1991
 Dolichogenidea finchi Fagan-Jeffries & Austin, 2018
 Dolichogenidea flavigastrula Chen & Song, 2004
 Dolichogenidea flavostriata (Papp, 1977)
 Dolichogenidea flexisulcus Liu & Chen, 2019
 Dolichogenidea flexitergita Liu & Chen, 2019
 Dolichogenidea fluctisulcus Liu & Chen, 2019
 Dolichogenidea forrestae Fagan-Jeffries & Austin, 2019
 Dolichogenidea frustrata (Papp, 1975)
 Dolichogenidea fumea Liu & Chen, 2018
 Dolichogenidea funalicauda Liu & Chen, 2018
 Dolichogenidea furtim (Papp, 1977)
 Dolichogenidea fuscivora Walker, 1994
 Dolichogenidea gagates (Nees, 1834)
 Dolichogenidea gallicola (Giraud, 1869)
 Dolichogenidea gansuensis Liu & Chen, 2018
 Dolichogenidea garytaylori Fagan-Jeffries & Austin, 2019
 Dolichogenidea gelechiidivoris (Marsh, 1975), a biological control used for Tuta absoluta on tomatoes.
 Dolichogenidea gentilis (Nixon, 1967)
 Dolichogenidea genuarnunezi Fernandez-Triana & Boudreault, 2019
 Dolichogenidea glabra (Papp, 1978)
 Dolichogenidea gleditsia Liu & Chen, 2019
 Dolichogenidea gobica (Papp, 1976)
 Dolichogenidea gobustanica (Kotenko, 1986)
 Dolichogenidea golovushkini (Kotenko, 1992)
 Dolichogenidea gracilariae (Wilkinson, 1940)
 Dolichogenidea gracilituba Song & Chen, 2004
 Dolichogenidea grata (Kotenko, 1986)
 Dolichogenidea halidayi (Marshall, 1872)
 Dolichogenidea hamakii (Watanabe, 1932)
 Dolichogenidea hanoii (Tobias & Long, 1990)
 Dolichogenidea hasorae Wilkinson, 1928
 Dolichogenidea hedyleptae (Muesebeck, 1958)
 Dolichogenidea helleni (Nixon, 1972)
 Dolichogenidea hemerobiellicida (Fischer, 1966)
 Dolichogenidea hemituba Liu & Chen, 2019
 Dolichogenidea heterusiae (Wilkinson, 1928)
 Dolichogenidea hexagona Liu & Chen, 2019
 Dolichogenidea hilaris (Haliday, 1834)
 Dolichogenidea homoeosomae (Muesebeck, 1933)
 Dolichogenidea hyalinis (Hedqvist, 1965)
 Dolichogenidea hyblaeae (Wilkinson, 1928)
 Dolichogenidea ilione (Nixon, 1967)
 Dolichogenidea immissa (Papp, 1977)
 Dolichogenidea imperator (Wilkinson, 1939)
 Dolichogenidea impura (Nees, 1834)
 Dolichogenidea incompleta (Szépligeti, 1914)
 Dolichogenidea incystatae Fernandez-Triana, 2019
 Dolichogenidea indicaphagous Liu & Chen, 2018
 Dolichogenidea infima (Haliday, 1834)
 Dolichogenidea infirmus Liu & Chen, 2019
 Dolichogenidea inquisitor (Wilkinson, 1928)
 Dolichogenidea interpolata (Papp, 1975)
 Dolichogenidea iranica (Telenga, 1955)
 Dolichogenidea iriarte (Nixon, 1965)
 Dolichogenidea iulis (Nixon, 1967)
 Dolichogenidea jaroshevskyi (Tobias, 1976)
 Dolichogenidea jilinensis Chen & Song, 2004
 Dolichogenidea josealfredohernandezi Fernandez-Triana & Boudreault, 2019
 Dolichogenidea kelleri Fagan-Jeffries & Austin, 2019
 Dolichogenidea kunhi Gupta & Kalesh, 2012
 Dolichogenidea kurosawai (Watanabe, 1940)
 Dolichogenidea labaris (Nixon, 1967)
 Dolichogenidea lacteicolor (Viereck, 1911)
 Dolichogenidea lacteipennis (Curtis, 1830)
 Dolichogenidea laevigata (Ratzeburg, 1848)
 Dolichogenidea laevigatoides (Nixon, 1972)
 Dolichogenidea laevissima (Ratzeburg, 1848)
 Dolichogenidea lakhaensis (Ray & Yousuf, 2009)
 Dolichogenidea lampe (Nixon, 1965)
 Dolichogenidea laspeyresiae (Viereck, 1913)
 Dolichogenidea laspeyresiella (Papp, 1972)
 Dolichogenidea laticauda Chen & Song, 2004
 Dolichogenidea latistigma (Papp, 1977)
 Dolichogenidea latitergita Liu & Chen, 2019
 Dolichogenidea lebene (Nixon, 1967)
 Dolichogenidea lemariei (Nixon, 1961)
 Dolichogenidea levifida (Kotenko, 1992)
 Dolichogenidea lincostulata Liu & Chen, 2019
 Dolichogenidea lineipes (Wesmael, 1837)
 Dolichogenidea lipsis (Nixon, 1967)
 Dolichogenidea lissos (Nixon, 1967)
 Dolichogenidea lobesiae Fagan-Jeffries & Austin, 2019
 Dolichogenidea locastrae (You & Tong, 1987)
 Dolichogenidea longialba Liu & Chen, 2019
 Dolichogenidea longicalcar (Thomson, 1895)
 Dolichogenidea longicauda (Wesmael, 1837)
 Dolichogenidea longimagna Liu & Chen, 2019
 Dolichogenidea longipalpis (Reinhard, 1880)
 Dolichogenidea longituba Song & Chen, 2004
 Dolichogenidea longivena Liu & Chen, 2018
 Dolichogenidea lucidinervis (Wilkinson, 1928)
 Dolichogenidea luctifica (Papp, 1971)
 Dolichogenidea lumba Rousse & Gupta, 2013
 Dolichogenidea lunata Liu & Chen, 2019
 Dolichogenidea maetoi Fernández-Triana & Shimizu, 2018
 Dolichogenidea malacosomae (Pandey, Ahmad, Haider & Shujauddin, 2004)
 Dolichogenidea marica (Nixon, 1972)
 Dolichogenidea maro (Nixon, 1967)
 Dolichogenidea marokkana (Fahringer, 1936)
 Dolichogenidea masoni Pandey, Ahmad, Haider & Shujauddin, 2005
 Dolichogenidea medicava Liu & Chen, 2019
 Dolichogenidea mediocaudata Fagan-Jeffries & Austin, 2018
 Dolichogenidea melaniamunozae Fernandez-Triana & Boudreault, 2019
 Dolichogenidea melanopus (Viereck, 1917)
 Dolichogenidea mendosae (Wilkinson, 1929)
 Dolichogenidea mesocanalis Liu & Chen, 2018
 Dolichogenidea metesae (Nixon, 1967)
 Dolichogenidea miantonomoi (Viereck, 1917)
 Dolichogenidea midas (Nixon, 1972)
 Dolichogenidea mimi (Papp, 1974)
 Dolichogenidea minuscula Liu & Chen, 2019
 Dolichogenidea mira (Papp, 1977)
 Dolichogenidea miris (Nixon, 1967)
 Dolichogenidea molestae (Muesebeck, 1933)
 Dolichogenidea monticola (Ashmead, 1890)
 Dolichogenidea multicolor Liu & Chen, 2019
 Dolichogenidea murinanae (Capek & Zwölfer, 1957)
 Dolichogenidea mycale (Nixon, 1972)
 Dolichogenidea myron (Nixon, 1973)
 Dolichogenidea nigra (Muesebeck, 1921)
 Dolichogenidea nixosiris (Papp, 1976)
 Dolichogenidea novoguineensis (Szépligeti, 1905)
 Dolichogenidea numenes (Nixon, 1967)
 Dolichogenidea oblicarina Chen & Song, 2004
 Dolichogenidea obscurugosa Liu & Chen, 2018
 Dolichogenidea obsoleta Liu & Chen, 2019
 Dolichogenidea obstans (Papp, 1971)
 Dolichogenidea oehlkei (Papp, 1982)
 Dolichogenidea oidaematophori (Muesebeck, 1929)
 Dolichogenidea olivierellae (Wilkinson, 1936)
 Dolichogenidea ononidis (Marshall, 1889)
 Dolichogenidea opacifinis Liu & Chen, 2019
 Dolichogenidea ovata Liu & Chen, 2019
 Dolichogenidea pallidalata (Tobias, 1964)
 Dolichogenidea palpator (Tobias, 1960)
 Dolichogenidea paracostulae Liu & Chen, 2018
 Dolichogenidea paralechiae (Muesebeck, 1932)
 Dolichogenidea parallelis (Ashmead, 1900)
 Dolichogenidea parallodorsum Liu & Chen, 2019
 Dolichogenidea parametacarp Liu & Chen, 2018
 Dolichogenidea paranthrenea (You & Dang, 1987)
 Dolichogenidea parasae (Rohwer, 1922)
 Dolichogenidea partergita Liu & Chen, 2018
 Dolichogenidea pelopea (Nixon, 1973)
 Dolichogenidea pelops (de Saeger, 1944)
 Dolichogenidea pentgona Liu & Chen, 2019
 Dolichogenidea petrovae (Walley, 1937)
 Dolichogenidea phaenna (Nixon, 1965)
 Dolichogenidea phaloniae (Wilkinson, 1940)
 Dolichogenidea phaola (Nixon, 1972)
 Dolichogenidea phthorimaeae (Muesebeck, 1921)
 Dolichogenidea piliventris (Tobias, 1966)
 Dolichogenidea pisenor (Nixon, 1965)
 Dolichogenidea platyedrae (Wilkinson, 1928)
 Dolichogenidea polaszeki Walker, 1994
 Dolichogenidea poliobrevis Liu & Chen, 2018
 Dolichogenidea politiventris (Muesebeck, 1958)
 Dolichogenidea polystinelliphagous Liu & Chen, 2018
 Dolichogenidea praetor (Marshall, 1885)
 Dolichogenidea praetoria (Tobias, 1976)
 Dolichogenidea princeps (Wilkinson, 1941)
 Dolichogenidea prisca (Nixon, 1967)
 Dolichogenidea probata (Papp, 1973)
 Dolichogenidea prodeniae (Viereck, 1912)
 Dolichogenidea propinqua (Papp, 1975)
 Dolichogenidea pterophori (Muesebeck, 1926)
 Dolichogenidea pulchra (Telenga, 1955)
 Dolichogenidea punctiger (Wesmael, 1837)
 Dolichogenidea punctipila Liu & Chen, 2019
 Dolichogenidea purdus (Papp, 1977)
 Dolichogenidea rectivena Liu & Chen, 2019
 Dolichogenidea reicharti (Papp, 1974)
 Dolichogenidea renata (Kotenko, 1986)
 Dolichogenidea renaulti (Mason, 1974)
 Dolichogenidea roepkei (Shenefelt, 1972)
 Dolichogenidea rogerblancoi Fernandez-Triana & Boudreault, 2019
 Dolichogenidea rufescentis Chen & Song, 2004
 Dolichogenidea sagus (Kotenko, 1986)
 Dolichogenidea sandwico Liu & Chen, 2018
 Dolichogenidea scabipuncta Chen & Song, 2004
 Dolichogenidea scabra (Tobias, 1977)
 Dolichogenidea seriphia (Nixon, 1972)
 Dolichogenidea sicaria (Marshall, 1885)
 Dolichogenidea simulata (Papp, 1974)
 Dolichogenidea singularis Yang & You, 2002
 Dolichogenidea sisenna (Nixon, 1972)
 Dolichogenidea soikai (Nixon, 1972)
 Dolichogenidea solenobiae (Walley, 1935)
 Dolichogenidea sonani (Watanabe, 1932)
 Dolichogenidea sophiae (Papp, 1972)
 Dolichogenidea spanis Chen & Song, 2004
 Dolichogenidea spinulicula Liu & Chen, 2018
 Dolichogenidea stantoni (Ashmead, 1904)
 Dolichogenidea statius (Nixon, 1965)
 Dolichogenidea stenosis Song & Chen, 2004
 Dolichogenidea stenotelas (Nixon, 1965)
 Dolichogenidea stictoscutella Liu & Chen, 2018
 Dolichogenidea striata (van Achterberg & Ng, 2009)
 Dolichogenidea subemarginata (Abdinbekova, 1969)
 Dolichogenidea subgentilis (Tobias & Long, 1990)
 Dolichogenidea sublabene (Tobias & Long, 1990)
 Dolichogenidea sugae (Watanabe, 1932)
 Dolichogenidea syngramma Ahmad & Pandey, 2019
 Dolichogenidea szalayi (Papp, 1977)
 Dolichogenidea szelenyii (Papp, 1972)
 Dolichogenidea taiwanensis (Sonan, 1942)
 Dolichogenidea tasmanica (Cameron, 1912)
 Dolichogenidea testacea Liu & Chen, 2018
 Dolichogenidea thujae (Muesebeck, 1935)
 Dolichogenidea tischeriae Viereck (1912)
 Dolichogenidea tobiasi (Balevski, 1980)
 Dolichogenidea trachalus (Nixon, 1965)
 Dolichogenidea transcarinata Liu & Chen, 2019
 Dolichogenidea tuliemensis (Tobias & Long, 1990)
 Dolichogenidea turcmenica (Tobias, 1967)
 Dolichogenidea turionellae (Nixon, 1971)
 Dolichogenidea turkmenus (Telenga, 1955)
 Dolichogenidea ultima (Kotenko, 1986)
 Dolichogenidea ultor (Reinhard, 1880)
 Dolichogenidea unicarina Liu & Chen, 2018
 Dolichogenidea upoluensis (Fullaway, 1941)
 Dolichogenidea uru Rousse & Gupta, 2013
 Dolichogenidea vadosulcus Liu & Chen, 2019
 Dolichogenidea varifemur (Abdinbekova, 1969)
 Dolichogenidea vernaliter (Wilkinson, 1932)
 Dolichogenidea victor (Wilkinson, 1941)
 Dolichogenidea victoria Liu & Chen, 2019
 Dolichogenidea victoriae (Muesebeck, 1921)
 Dolichogenidea victoriata (Kotenko, 1986)
 Dolichogenidea villemantae Rousse, 2013
 Dolichogenidea wangi Liu & Chen, 2019
 Dolichogenidea wittei (de Saeger, 1944)
 Dolichogenidea xenomorph Fagan-Jeffries & Austin, 2018
 Dolichogenidea yamini Sathe & Rokade, 2005
 Dolichogenidea yeimycedenoae Fernandez-Triana & Boudreault, 2019
 Dolichogenidea zerafai Papp, 2015
 Dolichogenidea zeris Papp, 2012

References

Dolichogenidea